Lara Jobim Matos Rodrigues (born Juiz de Fora, Minas Gerais, 22 December 1990) is a Brazilian actress.

Filmography

Television

Films

External links
 

Living people
1990 births
Brazilian film actresses
Brazilian telenovela actresses
People from Juiz de Fora